Serhiy Pokydin (born 16 March 1960 in Horlivka) is a retired Ukrainian football forward.

With a dissolution of the Soviet Union, Pokydin emigrated to Canada.

References

External links
 

1960 births
Living people
People from Horlivka
Soviet footballers
Soviet Top League players
FC Shakhtar Donetsk players
FC Shakhtar Horlivka players
Association football forwards
Montreal Ukrainians players
Sportspeople from Donetsk Oblast